79 km is a rural locality (a passing loop) in Shishinskoye Rural Settlement of Topkinsky District, Russia. The population was 26 as of 2010.

Streets 
 Zheleznodorozhnaya

Geography 
79 km is located 36 km west of Topki (the district's administrative centre) by road. Klyuchevoy is the nearest rural locality.

References 

Rural localities in Kemerovo Oblast